The 1992 St Albans City and District Council election took place on 7 May 1992 to elect members of St Albans City and District Council in England. This was on the same day as other local elections.

Election result

Ward results

Ashley

Batchwood

Clarence

Colney Heath

 
 

 

No Green candidate as previous (4.7%).

Cunningham

Harpenden East

Harpenden North

Harpenden South

 
 

 

No Green candidate as previous (2.9%).

Harpenden West

London Colney

 
 

 

No Green candidate as previous (3.3%).

Marshallwick North

 
 

 

No Green candidate as previous (2.7%).

Marshallwick South

Park Street

Redbourn

Sopwell

 
 

 

No Green candidate as previous (4.0%).

St. Peters

St. Stephens

 
 

 

No Green candidate as previous (3.2%).

Verulam

Wheathampstead

 
 

 

No Green candidate as previous (15.3%).

References

1991 English local elections
1992
May 1992 events in the United Kingdom